Ángel (Angel) is the third single from Belinda's debut studio album Belinda. It received a Gold certification in Mexico for ringtone sales.

Information 
The song was written by Graeme Pleeth and Shellie Poole; adapted by Belinda; produced by Graeme Pleeth and Mauri Stern. Was an enormous success in Mexico and an international success for Belinda.

Track list 
Mexican CD Single/Promo
 Ángel

Video 
In the video, Belinda has visions of the boyfriend dying in a car crash. The song asks "¿Cuándo se va a terminar o cuándo se hará realidad?" meaning "When is it going to be over or when is it going to be reality?". She states that her boyfriend is her 'Ángel'. The actor who portrayed the boyfriend, Eddy Vilard, is friends with Belinda in real life.

The music video was directed by Mexican video director Alejandro Lozano, and was premiered in January 2004 on MTV Latino.

Sales and certifications

References 

2004 singles
Belinda Peregrín songs
Pop ballads
Spanish-language songs
2003 songs
Song recordings produced by Graeme Pleeth
Song recordings produced by Mauri Stern
Songs written by Shelly Poole
Songs written by Belinda Peregrín